Diego Portales University (UDP) is one of the first private universities founded in Chile and is named after the Chilean statesman Diego Portales.

UDP has campuses in the Barrio Universitario de Santiago and Huechuraba.

History 

Universidad Diego Portales (UDP) was founded in 1982. It was an initiative of the founders of the Professional Institute of Sales and Advertising (IPEVE) which at that time had been in existence for almost 20 years (1963).

In 1983, the university embarked on its academic programme with the creation of three faculties: the Faculty of Law, the Faculty of Administrative Sciences, and the Faculty of Psychology. In 1989, two new faculties were created: the Faculty of Information and Communications and the Faculty of Engineering Sciences.

In 1991, the university decided to undergo the process of national accreditation with the aim of attaining the status of Autonomous University.

On March 18, 1993, the Superior Council for Education in plenary session ratified Universidad Diego Portales as successfully fulfilling its institution mission, for which it was designated as having “Full Institutional Autonomy”, authorized to bestow all categories of academic degree and title independently. Since 1993, the university has embarked on consolidation and growth in its academic programme.

In 1994, degree courses in Advertising and Design were transferred from IPEVE to Universidad Diego Portales, and the Bachelor of Arts degree programme was introduced. In 1999, the Faculty of Architecture, Design and Fine Arts was created and the Faculty of Humanities founded.

In 2002, Universidad Diego Portales took a step in its growth with the creation of new programs and its incursion into two new fields of knowledge: Health and Education. UDP that same year designed a plan for long-term infrastructure growth, involving the issue of a Security Bond guaranteed by the World Bank for approximately US$25 million, thus becoming the first educational institution to use this type of financing.

In 2004 Universidad Diego Portales became one of the first private universities to achieve institutional accreditation as a university from the National Undergraduate Accreditation Commission (CNAP) in three areas: Institutional Management, Undergraduate Teaching, and Equipment and Infrastructure.

Academic schools and programs

Universidad Diego Portales offers 31 undergraduate programs in daytime and evening formats at its faculties.

Faculty of Architecture, Art and Design, undergraduate programs in Architecture, Art and Design.
Faculty of Communications and Letters: Journalism, Advertising and Creative Literature.
Faculty of Economics and Business: Commercial Engineering, Engineering in Finance, Engineering in Marketing, Business Administration, Management Accounting and Public Accounting.
Faculty of Engineering and Sciences: Industrial Civil Engineering, Informatics and Telecommunications Civil Engineering, Civil Construction Engineering, Construction Engineering, Informatics and Management Engineering, and Industrial Engineering and Logistics Management.
Faculty of Health Sciences: Medicine, Odontology, Nursing and Medical Technology.
Faculty of Humanities and Education: Psychology, Pedagogy in General Primary Education and Pedagogy in Infant Education.
Faculty of History and Social Sciences: Bachelor of Social Sciences, Sociology, Political Science and History.
Faculty of Law, the degree in law.

There are 11,877 registered undergraduate students and more than 1,000 graduates students, with more than 16,000 in its alumni network.

Additionally, the university imparts postgraduate programmes.

The Faculty of Education and Humanities runs 
 Master of Psychology programmes specializing in Social Psychology, Theoretical and Clinical Psychoanalysis, Clinical Psychology specializing in Family and Couples Therapy, and Cognitive Development specializing in Dynamic Learning Propensity Assessment Device; * postgraduate courses in Clinical Psychoanalysis specializing in Adults, Clinical Psychology: Specialist in Transpersonal Humanist Psychotherapy, Psychomotricity, Specialist in Juvenile-Infant Clinical Psychology; specialist programmes in Education (Language and Communication, English as a Foreign Language, Artistic Education, Mathematical Education, Nature Study, Social Studies and Physical Education); and 
 diplomas in Juridical and Forensic Psychology and an International Diploma in Sports Psychology.

The Faculty of Health Sciences, in conjunction with the IberoAmerican University Foundation, offers an International master's degree in Nutrition and Dietetics, and a postgraduate degree in Nutrition and Applied Dietetics.

The Faculty of Communications and Letters offers a programme leading to an International master's degree in communication and an International Diploma in Management Communication.

The Faculty of Law offers master's degrees in Infant–Adolescent and Family Law, Constitutional Law and Public Institutions, and Criminal Law and the Penal Process; and postgraduate courses in Family Mediator Training.

The Faculties Economics and Business joined with the Faculty of Engineering through their Graduate Schools have developed an MBA programme with dual degree in Universitat Pompeu Fabra with specializations in Finance, Human Resources, Strategic Communication, Marketing and Quality Control and a Master in Finance; Masters programmes in Educational Management, Organizational Development and Behaviour, Information Technology Management, Systems Administration and Business Administration.

The Humanities Institute offers a master's degree programme in Contemporary Thought and a diploma in Contemporary Thought.

In 2005, there were 9959 registered postgraduate students.

International relations and agreements

UDP has an extensive network of working alliances and agreements with renowned universities, research centres, foundations and overseas organizations in more than 25 countries.

UDP maintains agreements with 120 universities from countries such as Argentina, Australia, Belgium, Bolivia, Brazil, Canada, Colombia, Costa Rica, Ecuador, Egypt, El Salvador, Finland, France, Germany, Honduras, Italy, Mexico, Nicaragua, Panama, Paraguay, Peru, Poland, Puerto Rico, Romania, Russia, Spain, the United States, and Venezuela.

Research and knowledge production

The growing importance of knowledge in the development of nations has led UDP to implement a programme of research and knowledge production oriented towards the search for solutions to national problems of high public impact.

In consequence, the Centre for Juridical Research of the Faculty of Law has made significant contributions towards the Penal Procedures Reform which is being implemented throughout the country; two other centres belonging to the Faculty of Humanities and Education (Cognitive Development Centre) and the Faculty of Communication and Letters (Journalism and Advertising Research Centre, CIPP) are implementing programmes of public interest in the areas of cognitive development, community strengthening and the role of the communications media in society.

Added to the above, the Humanities Institute and the Social Sciences Research Institute have embarked on multidisciplinary research programmes oriented towards relevant national issues, contributing to the national debate on a permanent basis from a rigorous new perspective.

The university is implementing 21 programmes with external financing from the National Fund for Scientific and Technological Development (FONDECYT), the Fund for the Development of Art and Culture (FONDART), the Bicentennial Programme of the National Council for Science and Technology (CONACYT), the Ministry of Planning and Cooperation (MIDEPLAN), the Ministry of Education (MINEDUC), the United Nations Development Programme and the National Council for Narcotics Control (UNDP-CONACE), and the European Commission's 6th Marco Programme, in the fields of Education, Psychology, Health, Law, Social Sciences, Humanities and Engineering. To these must be added the over 25 research projects that are financed internally.

Moreover, members of the academic staff have published more than 50 articles in ISI-indexed publications from 2005 to June 2006.

An Astronomy Nucleus was formed in 2013, being part of the Faculty of Engineering and Sciences.  It performs research in areas ranging from protoplanetary disks and extrasolar planets to supernovae, active galactic nuclei, and high redshift galaxies.  The group has a strong focus on observational astronomy, performing observations at X-ray, optical, infrared, and submillimiter/radio wavelengths. Its research programs utilize the world-class telescopes located in the north of Chile as well as space-based observatories.

Accreditation
Areas of accreditation from the National Undergraduate Accreditation Committee (CNAP) Institutional Accreditation 2008 to 2013.
 Institutional Management
 Undergraduate Teaching
 Infrastructure and Equipment

Infrastructure

With the implementation of their Infrastructural Plan, UDP has established a solid presence in the centre of Santiago in buildings extending over an area of 94,582 square metres that serve its university community.

This colossal project is the result of the work of a team of architects from the academic staff of the Faculty of Architecture, Art and Design of the university. With this project, UDP possesses the largest student infrastructure in the University District of Santiago, considered and projected around the life of its students, empowering the development of their academic, sporting and social activities.

UDP is building for economics faculty and postgrad, in "Ciudad empresarial", a business area in the north of Santiago. It is building a new library, central library of Diego Portales University, in downtown Santiago.

 Built-up area: 94,582 square metres
 Total land surface area of grounds: 61,341 square metres
 Surface area of laboratories: 5,000 square metres
 Number of laboratories: 28
 Clinical Departments in the Health Faculty: 33
 Surface area of Computation Facilities: 430 square metres
 Number of computers available: 1,396
 Number of undergraduate students: 11,877 (day and night school)
 Places per year in 2008: approximately 2,300
 Alumni network: 29,667 graduates

Academic staff

 1,331 professors 
 PhDs: 132  
 Master's degrees: 389
 Licentiates and technicians: 810

Library system

 Number of libraries: 11 
 Number of library books: 106,114 
 Number of texts in libraries: 55,662

Scholarships awarded 

 Total: 1,923 
 Internal: 1,835  
 External: 88

Research

 Professors participating in research projects: 149
 Institute for Scientific Information (ISI) Publications (to date): 200
 Scientific Electronic Library Online (SciELO) Publications (to date): 90

Projects (2005–2006)
 Number of projects financed internally (to date): 131 
 Number of projects with external financing (to date): 65 
 National Fund for Scientific and Technological Development (FONDECYT) Projects awarded: 37 
 Total UDP projects (main institution): 206

Notes

External links 

Diego Portales University indicators

 
1982 establishments in Chile
Educational institutions established in 1982